Phytoecia holonigra is a species of beetle in the family Cerambycidae. It was described by Stephan von Breuning in 1955. It is known from South Africa.

References

Phytoecia
Beetles described in 1955